East Nashville Skyline is a studio album by Nashville, Tennessee, singer-songwriter Todd Snider. The album was released in 2004. It was ranked the 7th best album of the year by Andrew Gilstrap in PopMatters.

Songs 
The album contains a variety of songs, most of them concerning moments in Snider's past, such as his addiction rehab and various other troubles throughout his life. The song "Age Like Wine" is a retrospective of his life, and Snider recounts his jailing in "Tillamook County Jail". The song "Ballad of The Kingsmen" concerns the controversy surrounding their hit song "Louie Louie".

Track listing 
All songs by Todd Snider, except where noted.

 Age Like Wine – 1:46
 Tillamook County Jail – 3:07
 Play a Train Song – 4:09
 Alcohol and Pills (Fred Eaglesmith) – 4:38
 Good News Blues (Billy Joe Shaver) – 3:13
 The Ballad of the Kingsmen – 5:03
 Iron Mike's Main Man's Last Request – 3:15
 Conservative Christian, Right-Wing Republican, Straight, White, American Males – 3:17
 Incarcerated – 2:10
 Nashville – 2:26
 Sunshine – 4:58
 Enjoy Yourself (Herb Magidson and Carl Sigman) – 3:27

Charts

References 

2004 albums
Todd Snider albums
Americana albums
Folk rock albums by American artists
Oh Boy Records albums